The Rural Municipality of Val Marie No. 17 is a rural municipality (RM) in the Canadian province of Saskatchewan within Census Division No. 4 and  Division No. 3. Located in the southwest portion of the province, it is adjacent to the United States border, neighbouring Phillips County in Montana.

History 

The RM of Val Marie No. 17 incorporated as a rural municipality on January 1, 1969. Louis-Pierre Gravel, missionary and promoter of much French Catholic immigration to southwestern Saskatchewan, originally called the settlement Rivière des Français after the nearby Frenchman River. But for an unknown reason, in a 1911 report to the superintendent of immigration, his formally proposed name became Libreval ("Free Valley"). Ultimately, neither of Gravel's suggestions was used, and Val Marie ("Valley of Mary"), was coined by Fr. Claude Passaplan, missionary priest in the area. Before coming to Val Marie, Passaplan served as the first Roman Catholic parish priest in Swift Current.

Geography

Communities and localities 

The RM surrounds one urban municipality, the eponymous village of Val Marie. Both communities share an office and an administrator.

Villages
 Val Marie

Hutterite colonies
 Sand Lake Colony
 Butte Colony

Unorganized hamlets
 Orkney

Localities
 Beaver Valley
 Gergovia
 Hillandale
 Masefield
 Monchy
 Roche Plain
 Rosefield

Demographics 

Economy 

Due to its semi-arid climate, Val Marie is a mixed district where ranching and crop agriculture are both practiced. Much of the RM is occupied by large community pastures. The Val Marie Irrigation Project controls two artificial lakes on the Frenchman River, which are used to operate a drip irrigation system in the region adjacent to the village.

The creation of Grasslands National Park in 1981 has bolstered the region's tourism sector, and the RM is home to two guesthouses, as well as the park's operations compound.

Although there are no oil wells in the vicinity of Val Marie, the RM is transited by a major pipeline, and the Monchy Compressor Station sits directly on the Canada-United States border.

Attractions 

The RM includes the western portion (or "West Block") of Grasslands National Park.

Government 

The RM of Val Marie No. 17 is governed by an elected municipal council and an appointed administrator that meets on the second Tuesday of every month. The reeve of the RM is Larry Grant while its administrator is Cathy Legault. The RM's office is located in Val Marie.

Transportation 
Highway 18—serves Val Marie, Saskatchewan and Orkney, Saskatchewan
Highway 4—serves Val Marie, Saskatchewan

See also 
List of rural municipalities in Saskatchewan

References 

 
Val Marie
Division No. 4, Saskatchewan